is a Japanese actress. She was given a Best New Talent award at the 2009 Yokohama Film Festival. Naka became famous by appearing in Hachi One Diver (2008) and played the lead, Hana Adachi, in Yankee-kun to Megane-chan (2010). Naka also portrayed cousins Makoto Konno and Akari Yoshiyama who are the protagonists in respectively the 2006 anime film The Girl Who Leapt Through Time and the 2010 live action movie Time Traveller: The Girl Who Leapt Through Time, both of which are based on the 1967 novel Toki wo Kakeru Shoujo by Yasutaka Tsutsui.

Personal life
Naka has a Swedish grandfather, making her one-quarter Swedish and three-quarters Japanese. She was named Riisa after Leonardo da Vinci’s Mona Lisa painting which her grandfather had an affection for.

She was given a Best New Talent award at the 2009 Yokohama Film Festival and became famous by appearing in Hachi One Diver, a drama that aired in 2008.

Naka co-starred with actor Akiyoshi Nakao in Toki wo Kakeru Shoujo in 2010 and again in the NHK drama Tsurukame Josanin, which aired in August 2012. They started dating after the filming for the drama ended in October 2012.

In spring 2013, it was announced that Naka would marry Nakao, with the wedding being held on March 21, 2013. On October 4, 2013, Naka gave birth to the couple's first child, a son at a hospital in Tokyo. 

Her skills are Japanese dancing, piano and swimming.

Filmography

Dramas
 My Boss My Hero (2006) - Chiba Akane
 Yakusha Damashii (2006) - episode 7 guest
 Broccoli (2007) 
 Ultraman Mebius (2007) - episode 40 guest
 Jodan janai (2007) - Hirose Karen
 Sexy Voice and Robo (2007) - episode 5 guest
 Binbō Danshi (2008) - Shinjo Sumire
 Hachi One Diver (2008) - Soyo Nakashizu/ Milk
 Gakko ja Oshierarenai! (2008) - Yokoyama Eri
 Kami no Shizuku (2009) - co-starring - Shinohara Miyabi
 Ninkyou Helper (2009) - Haruna Misora
 Koibana: Suika to Bansoukou (2009)
 Yankee-kun to Megane-chan (2010) - Hana Adachi (lead)
 The Japanese The Japanese Don't Know (2010) - Kano Haruko (lead)
 Sayonara Aruma (2010) - Takahashi Fumiko
 Party wa Owatta (2011) - Toake
 Shiawase ni Narou yo (2011) - Sakuragi Marika
 Lucky Seven (2012) - Mizuno Asuka
 Tsurukame Maternity Center (2012) - Onodera Mariya
 Resident – 5-nin no Kenshui (2012) - Miyama Shizuku 
 Lucky Seven SP (2013) - Mizuno Asuka
 Cold Case (2016)
 I love You Just a Little Bit (2017) - Reika Arishima
 Black Leather Notebook (2017) - Namiko Yamada
 Plage ~ Wakeari bakari no share house (2017) - Koike Miwa
 Yell (2020) - Megumi Katori
 Koisuru Hahatachi (2020) - Kanbara Mari
 Alice in Borderland (2020–2022) - Mira Kanō
 Tokyo MER: Mobile Emergency Room (2021) - Chiaki Takanawa
 Ōoku: The Inner Chambers (2023) - Tokugawa Tsunayoshi

Movies
 The Girl Who Leapt Through Time (2006) - Makoto Konno (lead)
 Island Times (2006) - Yuki
 Shibuya-ku Maruyama-cho (2006) - Yumi 
 Chi-chan wa Yukyu no Muko (2008) - Chigusa Utashima
 Gachi Boy (2008) - Akane Igarashi
 It's So Quiet (2008) - Chizuru
 Jun Kissa Isobe (2008) - Sakiko Isobe
 An Encyclopedia of Unconventional Women (2009) - Ryoko
 Pandora no Hako (2009) - Mabo
 Summer Wars (2009) - Yumi Jinnouchi
 Time Traveller: The Girl Who Leapt Through Time (2010) - Akari Yoshiyama (lead)
 Zebraman 2: Attack on Zebra City (2010) - Zebra Queen/Yui
 Hara ga Kore Nande (2011) - Hara Mitsuko
 Moteki (2011) - Ai
 Young Black Jack (2011) - Yuna
 Brave Hearts: Umizaru (2012) - Mika
 The Mole Song: Undercover Agent Reiji (2014)
 The Mole Song: Hong Kong Capriccio (2016)
 A Forest of Wool and Steel (2018) - Eri Hamano
 My Dad Is a Heel Wrestler (2018) - Michiko
 Love At Least (2018)
 Brothers in Brothel (2021) - Ibuki
 The Mole Song: Final (2021)
 Crayon Shin-chan: Shrouded in Mystery! The Flowers of Tenkazu Academy (2021) - Ageha (voice)
 Tokyo MER: Mobile Emergency Room: The Movie (2023) - Chiaki Takanawa

Plays
 Dokurojo no Shichinin (2011)

Dubbing
 Trolls World Tour (2020) - Queen Barb

Music videos
 Kimi wa Boku ni Niteiru (2005) - See-Saw
 Captain Straydum (2006) - Cyborg
 Nostalgia (2010) - Ikimono Gakari
 Honto Wa Kowai Ai To Romance (2010) - Keisuke Kuwata
 Boku Kimi Believer (2010) - Ghostnote

Discography
  as Zebra Queen (2010)

References

External links
 
  
 Amuze profile 

1989 births
Living people
Actors from Nagasaki Prefecture
Japanese female models
Japanese people of Swedish descent
Models from Nagasaki Prefecture
Amuse Inc. talents
21st-century Japanese actresses
21st-century Japanese women singers